Paul Shaw is an American designer, calligrapher and historian of design who lives in New York City. He has written a book on the history of the design of the New York City Subway system, Helvetica and the New York Subway System: The True (Maybe) Story, on the work of William Addison Dwiggins, and for Print magazine. His book on the New York subway is known as one of the best modern design books.  He received the annual SoTA Typography Award of 2019. Paul Shaw is Editor-in-Chief of Codex, Journal of Letterforms and The Eternal Letter Design.  His work has won awards from the AIGA Directors Club and the Art Directors Club of New York.

References

External links

Helvetica and the New York City Subway System (book website)

Living people
Reed College alumni
Design history
21st-century American historians
21st-century American male writers
American graphic designers
Historians of printing
Year of birth missing (living people)
American male non-fiction writers